This is a list of States of India ranked according to the number of registered motor vehicles per 1000 population, as of 2011–2012. The list is compiled from the Road Transport Yearbook 2011–2012 published by Ministry of Road Transport and Highways, Government of India. India have low vehicle per 1000 population ration in world. Chandigarh has the highest 702 per thousand population and Bihar has the lowest 31 vehicle per thousand populations.

List

Number of Vehicles by States and Union territory

Notes

References

States and union territories of India-related lists
Lists of subdivisions of India
Automotive industry in India
Ranked lists of country subdivisions